Nguyễn Thủy Tiên (born 26 February 1994), known professionally as Tiên Cookie, is a Vietnamese singer-songwriter, music producer, and businesswoman. She founded her own record label, 1989s Entertainment, in 2016. She was named among the songwriters with various popular songs.

Life and career

Nguyen was born on 26 February 1994 in Hanoi, Vietnam. Her music aspiration came after recording a song in a studio for a friend during middle school. After taking some music theory and guitar lessons, she wrote her first song "Waiting on Valentine" at the age of 14. Nguyen left Hanoi for Saigon to develop her music career at the age of 18. She was noted by the media for having created several popular songs including "If We Ever Say Goodbye" (2011), "Talking To A Stranger" (2015), and "Behind A Girl" (2016). In 2016, Nguyen founded her own record label, 1989s Entertainment. She performed some of her own songs during the earlier stage of her career, but transitioned towards being a full-time music producer after her company establishment. In 2018, her song "Love Charm", which was sung by Bích Phương, swept several awards at the Green Wave Awards including Song Of The Year and Excellent Songwriting Team. In 2019, Nguyen was honored Music Producer Of The Year at the Dedication Music Award.

List of songs written

Awards and nominations

References

External links

1994 births
Living people
21st-century Vietnamese women singers
Vietnamese pop singers
Vietnamese songwriters